V. Venkatasubba Reddiar was the second Chief Minister of the Union Territory of Pondicherry (Puducherry). He was born in a wealthy agricultural family at Madukkarai, Pondicherry. His parents are Vaithilingam Reddiar and Vemalammal. His father Vaithilingam Reddiar was the Mayor of Nettapakkam commune during French rule. His son V. Vaithilingam was also the chief minister of Pondicherry.

Political career
According to The Hindu, Reddiar was "considered one of the architects who spearheaded the freedom struggle movement against the French." In 1946, as Mayor of Nettapakkam, he joined with the Mayor of Pondicherry (K. Muthu Pillai) to demand the French leave the territory and allow it to merge with the Indian Union. Twelve leaders including Reddiar formed a parallel government against French Government on 31 March 1954; Pondicherry merged with the Indian Union on 13 October 1954. On 1 July 1963, Reddiar became the Public Works Minister of Pondicherry and subsequently, became Chief Minister.

See also
 1959 Pondicherry Representative Assembly election
 1964 Pondicherry Legislative Assembly election

References 

Chief ministers of Puducherry
1981 deaths
1909 births
Chief ministers from Indian National Congress
State cabinet ministers of Puducherry
Indian National Congress politicians from Puducherry
Puducherry politicians
Puducherry MLAs 1963–1964